The 2005–06 season was Birmingham City Football Club's 103rd season in the English football league system and their fourth in the Premier League. Under the management of Steve Bruce, they finished in 18th position in the 20-team division, so were relegated to the Championship for 2006–07. They entered the 2005–06 FA Cup at the third round and progressed to the sixth round (quarter-final), in which they suffered their heaviest ever FA Cup defeat, and their heaviest defeat at St Andrew's in any competition, losing 7–0 at home to Liverpool. They also reached the quarter-final of the League Cup, in which they were eliminated by Manchester United.

Jiří Jarošík was top scorer in league competition, with just five goals. If all competitions are included, Jarošík and fellow loanee Mikael Forssell scored eight apiece.

Pre-season

Pre-season friendlies

Note 1: Each match was 45 minutes long as part of a short three team tournament in Spain

Premier League

Match details

League table

Results summary

FA Cup

League Cup

Transfers

In

 Brackets round club names indicate the player's contract with that club had expired before he joined Birmingham.

Out

 Brackets round club names denote the player joined that club after his Birmingham City contract expired.

Loan in

Loan out

Appearances and goals

Numbers in parentheses denote appearances as substitute.
Players with squad numbers struck through and marked  left the club during the playing season.
Players with names in italics and marked * were on loan from another club for the whole of their season with Birmingham.

See also
Birmingham City F.C. seasons

References
General
 
 
 Source for match dates, league positions and results: 
 Source for lineups, appearances, goalscorers and attendances: Matthews (2010), Complete Record, pp. 446–47.
 Source for goal times: 
 Source for transfers: 

Specific

Birmingham City F.C. seasons
Birmingham City